is a Japanese astronomer and discoverer of asteroids and comets. He is credited by the Minor Planet Center with the discovery of 73 minor planets. He also co-discovered 147P/Kushida-Muramatsu, a periodic comet.

Muramatsu works at the planetarium in the Shibuya ward of Tokyo, Japan. The inner main-belt asteroid 5606 Muramatsu, discovered by astronomer and college Satoru Otomo, was named in his honor on 28 July 1999.

References

External links 
 The discovery of 147P

1949 births
Discoverers of asteroids

20th-century Japanese astronomers
Living people